Leon Paweł Teodor Marchlewski (15 December 1869 in Włocławek – 16 January 1946  in Kraków, Poland) was a Polish chemist and an Honorary Member of the Polish Chemical Society.

He was one of the founders in the field of chlorophyll chemistry. The illustration on the right is of his diplomatic passport he used in 1927 to attend an international conference on chemistry in Paris.

References

External links

1869 births
1946 deaths
Burials at Rakowicki Cemetery
People from Włocławek
Polish senators
Polish chemists
Chemical pathologists
Members of the Lwów Scientific Society
Rectors of the Jagiellonian University
Commanders of the Order of Polonia Restituta